Cullen Eddy (born November 18, 1988) is an American former professional ice hockey defenseman who played in the American Hockey League (AHL) and the British Elite Ice Hockey League (EIHL).

Playing career
On August 3, 2011, it was announced that Eddy had re-signed with the Adirondack Phantoms. Eddy was signed to a two-year entry level contract by the Philadelphia Flyers on July 3, 2012.

On August 7, 2014, Eddy signed a two-year contract with the Sheffield Steelers. Eddy announced his retirement from hockey after being part of two EIHL championship seasons with Sheffield.

Career statistics

Awards and honors

References

External links

1988 births
Living people
Adirondack Phantoms players
American men's ice hockey defensemen
Cincinnati Cyclones (ECHL) players
Greenville Road Warriors players
Ice hockey players from Pennsylvania
Mercyhurst Lakers men's ice hockey players
Sheffield Steelers players